Reichshoffen (or ; ; Alsatian: Risshoffe) is a commune in the Bas-Rhin department in Grand Est in north-eastern France. Église Saint-Michel de Reichshoffen was built in 1772.

Economy

Reichshoffen is home to CAF Reichshoffen railcar operations, formerly owned by Alstom.

Population

Politics and administration

List of mayors

Twin towns 
  Kandel (Germany) since 1961.

See also
 Battle of Wörth, also known as the Battle of Reichshoffen
 Communes of the Bas-Rhin department

References

Communes of Bas-Rhin
Bas-Rhin communes articles needing translation from French Wikipedia